Call of the Mastodon is a compilation album of early recordings from the American metal band Mastodon. It was released on February 7, 2006, by Relapse Records.

Content
Call of the Mastodon contains the same nine songs as Mastodon's first release, 9 Song Demo; however, the compilation features re-recorded versions of the songs (the same recordings which appeared on the band's early EPs Slick Leg and Lifesblood). For this reason, guitarist/vocalist Brent Hinds referred to Call of the Mastodon as the band's first studio album in a documentary on the making of Crack the Skye. This sentiment was also echoed by Bill Kelliher when he appeared on Loudwire's 'Wikipedia: Fact or Fiction'.

Track listing

Personnel
Mastodon
Brann Dailor – drums, vocals on "Battle at Sea"
Brent Hinds – guitar, vocals
Bill Kelliher – guitar
Troy Sanders – bass, vocals

Others
Matt Washburn (LedBelly Sound Studio) – production, editing, mixing, mastering
Paul Romano – artwork

Charts

References 

Mastodon (band) albums
2006 compilation albums
Relapse Records compilation albums